Henry C. Taylor (c. 1814 – March 30, 1889) was the seventh mayor of Jersey City in New Jersey.

Biography
He succeeded Phineas C. Dummer and served two years from April 21, 1848 to April 18, 1850. He was succeeded by Robert Gilchrist.  After serving as mayor, Taylor moved to Plainfield, New Jersey, where he died in 1889. Taylor was buried in Woodlawn Cemetery.

See also
List of mayors of Jersey City, New Jersey

References

1810s births
1889 deaths
Mayors of Jersey City, New Jersey
19th-century American politicians